Agbonayinma Ehiozuwa (born 1961) is a Nigerian politician and musician and a former member House of Representatives of Nigeria.

Early life and education 
In 1978, Ehiozuwa attended Agbado Primary School before proceeding to Airwele High School for his secondary education in 1983. he further study Security and Intelligence at the University of Houston, Texas.

References 

1961 births
Edo State politicians
Nigerian musicians
Living people
Members of the House of Representatives (Nigeria)
Peoples Democratic Party members of the House of Representatives (Nigeria)
Nigerian businesspeople
University of Houston alumni
People from Abuja